We Sure Can Love Each Other is a studio album by American country artist, Tammy Wynette. It was released on May 3, 1971 via Epic Records and was the eleventh studio album released in her career. The disc contained a total of 11 tracks, mixing new material with cover tunes. The title track was the only singles included and became a chart-topping country song in North America. The album itself also charted in the top ten of the American country albums chart and received positive reviews by critics.

Background, recording and content
Tammy Wynette had become among country music's most popular artists during the sixties and seventies. She had a string of chart-topping and top ten country songs, including her signature recording of "Stand by Your Man" (1969). Between 1971 and 1973 alone, Wynette had five number one singles on the country charts. Among these recordings was 1971's "We Sure Can Love Each Other". Co-written by Wynette, she was inspired to write the track after hearing Johnny Cash say "we sure can hurt each other" on a talk show. Wynette's eleventh studio album was named for the single. Material for the project was recorded between February 1970 and February 1971. Sessions were held at Columbia Studio B, located in Nashville, Tennessee. The project was produced by Billy Sherrill.

We Sure Can Love Each Other consisted of 11 tracks. Several cover tunes were included on the album. The track "If You I Love You Now (I've Just Started)" was first a top 20 country single by Jody Miller in 1970. "Bring Him Safely Home to Me" was recorded around the same time by Sandy Posey, whose version was a top 20 country single in 1971. Another recording, "Have a Little Faith", was a chart-topping country song for David Houston in 1968. Remaining tracks were new material such as "He Knows All the Ways to Love", "Make Me Your Kind of Woman" and "Don't Liberate Me (Love Me)". The latter recording was considered a protest song against the Equal Rights Amendment in the United States. Its lyrics describe how a housewife enjoys being a homemaker and wants to "remain a woman".

Release, chart performance, singles and reception

We Sure Can Love Each Other was originally released on May 3, 1971 on Epic Records. It was originally distributed as a vinyl LP and a cassette. Five tracks were included on the first side while six tracks were included on the second side. Decades later it was reissued digitally by Sony Music Entertainment during the 2010s, however a specific date is not known. Following its initial release, the album received a positive review by Billboard in May 1971. Critics found it to include "some of her best performances", while concluding, "Heart and soul performances, a top chart item." Years later, it was given three out of stars by AllMusic. The disc peaked at number eight on the American Billboard Top Country Albums chart in July 1971. It also reached number 115 on the Billboard 200 and charted at number 11 on the Canadian RPM Top Tape Sellers chart. It was Wynette's only chart entry on the Tape Sellers list. The title track was the only single included. It was originally released by Epic in February 1971. By April 1971, the song reached number two on the Billboard Hot Country Songs chart while also topping the RPM Country Tracks chart.

Track listing

Personnel
All credits are adapted from the liner notes of We Sure Can Love Each Other.

Al Clayton – photography
The Jordanaires – backing vocals
Billy Sherrill – producer
Tammy Wynette – lead vocals

Charts

Release history

References 

1971 albums
Tammy Wynette albums
Epic Records albums
Albums produced by Billy Sherrill